The women's 100 metre backstroke competition at the 2014 Pan Pacific Swimming Championships took place on August 21 at the Gold Coast Aquatic Centre.  The last champion was Emily Seebohm of Australia.

This race consisted of two lengths of the pool, all in backstroke.

Records
Prior to this competition, the existing world and Pan Pacific records were as follows:

Results
All times are in minutes and seconds.

Heats
The first round was held on August 21, at 10:55.

B Final 
The B final was held on August 21, at 20:06.

A Final 
The A final was held on August 21, at 20:06.

References

2014 Pan Pacific Swimming Championships
2014 in women's swimming